Uruguay Montevideo Football Club is a football club from Montevideo in Uruguay.

The club were disaffiliated from the second professional division of the Uruguayan Football Association in 2007 and re-entered the league for 2008-2009 at the third level, which is the bottom and the only amateur level of the league's pyramid, named the Segunda División Amateur.

The club got their name from two ships from the Uruguayan Navy, called Destructor Uruguay and Destructor Montevideo.

Titles
 Uruguayan Segunda División Amateur (2): 1993, 2002
 Divisional Intermedia (4): 1950, 1955, 1957, 1965

External links
 Official site

Football clubs in Uruguay
Association football clubs established in 1921
Football clubs in Montevideo
1921 establishments in Uruguay